Keysi Mairin Sayago Arrechedera (born 6 October 1993), formerly known professionally as Keysi Sayago, is a Venezuelan model, TV host and beauty pageant titleholder who won Miss Venezuela 2016. She represented the state of Monagas at the pageant and represented Venezuela at the Miss Universe 2017.

Early life 
Sayago was born in Carrizal, Miranda. Sayago lived the first years of her childhood in Carrizal, until her parents decided to move to Los Teques, and from an early age she became interested in modeling, which is why her mother, she enrolled in modeling classes at age 12.

Sayago is a mechanical engineer of National Experimental University of the Armed Forces in Los Teques, Miranda, where she lives.

In October 2017, she settled in Toronto, Canada to continue her career as a professional.

Career

Modeling
Sayago participated in the first edition of the beauty contest American Model Venezuela 2010, organized by the model agency Xtreme Model, being the winner.

Miss Venezuela 2016
Sayago was among the three women pre-selected during the Miss Miranda casting. The other two were Maria Victoria D'Ambrosio and Rosangelica Piscitelli.

During the sashing ceremony, D'Ambrosio and Piscitelli were assigned as Miss Guarico and Miranda, respectively. Meanwhile, Sayago was assigned as Miss Monagas. D'Ambrosio ended up in the Top 10 while Piscitelli, despite winning several awards, placed fifth (fourth runner-up).

Sayago competed as Miss Monagas 2016, one of 24 finalists in her country's national beauty pageant, she obtained the Miss Attitude and Most Beautiful Smile awards at the Interactive Beauty Gala, which was the preliminary of Miss Venezuela 2016, which was held on October 6, 2016, in Caracas, where she became the second Miss Venezuela winner to represent the state of Monagas.

Miss Universe 2017
Sayago represented Venezuela at Miss Universe 2017 held on November 26, 2017, at The AXIS in Las Vegas, Nevada and placed Top 5.

2017–present
In June 2017, she was the host of the program Más allá de la Belleza in her tenth season, being her debut as a television presenter. The program tells interviews, essays and unpublished material about Miss Venezuela.

On August 18, 2018, she was judge of the Canadian Miss Canada beauty contest.

In October 2018, she paraded at Toronto Fashion Week.

In February 2019, she repeated at Toronto Fashion Week.

References

External links

1993 births
Living people
Venezuelan female models
Miss Universe 2017 contestants
Miss Venezuela winners
People from Miranda (state)
Venezuelan women engineers